Érika de Souza Miranda (born 4 June 1987) is a Brazilian judoka.

She won the silver medal in the Half-lightweight −52 kg division at the 2011 Pan American Games in Guadalajara, Mexico. She competed at the 2016 Summer Olympics in the women's 52 kg event, in which she lost the bronze medal match to Misato Nakamura.  She also competed in that division at the 2012 Summer Olympics but was knocked out in the second round.

References

External links

 
 

Judoka at the 2011 Pan American Games
Olympic judoka of Brazil
Judoka at the 2012 Summer Olympics
Judoka at the 2016 Summer Olympics
Living people
1987 births
Brazilian female judoka
Pan American Games gold medalists for Brazil
Pan American Games silver medalists for Brazil
Pan American Games medalists in judo
Judoka at the 2015 Pan American Games
Sportspeople from Brasília
Medalists at the 2011 Pan American Games
Medalists at the 2015 Pan American Games
20th-century Brazilian women
21st-century Brazilian women